"Jungle" is a song by the American rock band Kiss from their 1997 studio album Carnival of Souls: The Final Sessions. It was also released as the album's promotional single and was later included on the 2014 compilation album Kiss 40, which featured a track from every Kiss album.

Although Kiss never performed the track live, it would be performed in later years by Bruce Kulick and Eric Singer as part of Eric Singer Project and was included on the ESP Live at the Marquee DVD.

Background and composition 
"Jungle" is the sixth track on the band's 1997 studio album Carnival of Souls: The Final Sessions. and was written by Paul Stanley together with Bruce Kulick and Curtis Cuomo.

With a running time of 6:49, "Jungle" is the longest song that Kiss has ever recorded on a studio album.

Brett Weiss' Encyclopedia of KISS says that the song has a "semi-funky grunge-lite riff" that "recalls Collective Soul's U.S. hit "Shine".

Commercial performance
The song was a minor United States hit for the band, reaching number 8 on the Billboard Mainstream Rock Tracks chart despite a lack of promotion.

Awards

"Jungle" won the 1997 Metal Edge Readers' Choice Award for Song of the Year.

|-
| 1997
| "Jungle"
| Metal Edge Readers' Choice Award for Song of the Year
| 
|-

Personnel 
Paul Stanley – lead and backing vocals 
Bruce Kulick – all guitars, bass
Eric Singer – drums

References

External links 
 "Jungle" at Discogs

1997 singles
Kiss (band) songs
Mercury Records singles
Songs written by Paul Stanley
Songs written by Bruce Kulick
Songs written by Curtis Cuomo